Live a Little is an album by Pernice Brothers, released in 2006.

Track listing

In the booklet for the CD, the song High As A Kite, there are several references to The Clash, "heavy downbeat of one and the show began/london calling, strike up the contraband/" and "we wore pictures of Strummer/fell over ourselves all summer", more than likely referring to Joe Strummer.

On this CD, Joe Pernice's brother Bob plays  electric guitar on several songs: they are "Automaton", "Zero Refills", "PCH One", "Lightheaded" and "High As A Kite".
Bob is an occasional fixture in the band, though he does not play with them all the time.

Pernice Brothers albums
2006 albums